Ḱafa is a village in the municipality of Gostivar, North Macedonia. The name of the village comes from Albanian word qafë meaning "neck".

Demographics
As of the 2021 census, Ḱafa had zero residents.

According to the 2002 census, the village had a total of 5 inhabitants. Ethnic groups in the village include:

Albanians 5

References

External links

Villages in Gostivar Municipality
Albanian communities in North Macedonia